Adlestrop railway station was a railway station which served the village of Adlestrop in Gloucestershire, England, between 1853 and 1966. It was on what is now called the Cotswold Line. The station was immortalised in the poem "Adlestrop" by Edward Thomas after his train stopped there on 24 June 1914.

History
The line through Adlestrop was dualled on 2 August 1858, after the sections between Wolvercot -  and Handborough to Charlbury were respectively doubled on 18 November 1853 and 1 August 1854. The station had a broad gauge passing loop, but the only broad gauge train to use it was the inspection special, two days before opening. Adlestrop served the rural villages of Oddington and Adlestrop, for which Adlestrop House was the major feature.

Facilities for goods traffic were on the Up side (the side for passengers toward London): a  loading bank which could hold four wagons, a  goods shed with a  crane where a further three wagons could be held, with capacity for a further thirteen on the Worcester side of the shed. A signal box was added in 1907, which controlled access to the goods shed as well as to the refuge siding on the Down side which held 46 wagons. A 5-ton weighbridge was located on the Up side near the goods shed and main station building; this was replaced in 1938 by a 10-ton model which cost £160. The main station building on the Up platform was timber-built and originally designed by Brunel, with the construction being completed by John Fowler. On the Down side a wooden waiting shelter was provided, behind which was the station house constructed in alternating courses of red and grey bricks.

On 1 January 1860 the OW&W became part of the West Midland Railway which, on 1 August 1863, was absorbed by the Great Western Railway. It then passed on to the Western Region of British Railways after nationalisation in 1948. British Railways closed Adlestrop to goods traffic on 26 August 1963 and to passenger traffic on 3 January 1966. The signal box closed on 27 April 1964 and the sidings were made redundant.

The site today

The station building was demolished soon after closure in 1966. A station seat and one of the two station nameboards were rescued and were subsequently moved to a bus shelter in the village. The other nameboard was also rescued and given to the alma mater of Edward Thomas, Lincoln College, Oxford, and subsequently destroyed. Trains on the Cotswold Line pass the station site in the Evenlode Valley, where all evidence of its existence has vanished. The stationmaster's house is now a private residence, while the former goods yard is a vehicle dump.

"Adlestrop" poem

Despite the station's demise, it is better-known today than many small stations still open as a result of the short poem "Adlestrop" by Edward Thomas, written in 1914, which recounts the moment in June that year when the train on which the poet was a passenger stopped at Adlestrop. Thomas's field note books show that the stop was made at 12.45 which corresponds to a scheduled down stopping service, not an unscheduled stop by an express as described in the poem. Other elements in the poem are based on stops by the same train at Campden and Colwall. A bench bearing a plaque with the poem engraved on it was transferred to a bus shelter in the village.

Notes

Sources

External links

 Signal Box Diagram
 Adlestrop station on navigable Ordnance Survey map

Disused railway stations in Gloucestershire
Former Great Western Railway stations
Railway stations in Great Britain opened in 1853
Railway stations in Great Britain closed in 1966
Beeching closures in England
1853 establishments in England
1966 disestablishments in England